Ranjana Srivastava  is an oncologist, Fulbright scholar and author from Melbourne. She is a regular columnist for The Guardian newspaper, where she writes about the intersection between medicine and humanity, and a frequent essayist for the New England Journal of Medicine. She was a finalist for the Walkley Award for Excellence in Journalism in 2018.

She has also written many non-fiction books related to health and medicine, has appeared frequently on TV and radio, and publicly speaks at events, where she addresses various topics and matters.

Early life and education
Ranjana Srivastava was born in Canberra, Australia in 1974. Her parents were born and raised in India.

Her father's occupation as a physicist meant the family moved around the world living near universities. Her schooling took place mainly in India, 
but also in the United States, the United Kingdom, and Australia. She received her medical degree with first class honours from Monash University. In 2004, she received the distinguished Fulbright Award, which she used to obtain a fellowship in medical ethics and doctor-patient communication at the MacLean Center for Clinical Medical Ethics at the University of Chicago. Srivastava received a second Fulbright Award to undertake a Master in Public Administration (MPA) at Harvard University. She is also the recipient of a John F. Kennedy merit scholarship to Harvard University.

Career
Srivastava works in the public healthcare system in Victoria. She says that her early experiences have drawn her to the care of migrants and refugees and improving conditions in areas of disadvantage. Her own experience of losing twins in utero has led her to a keen appreciation of the need for honesty and truth-telling in medicine.

A regular contributor to the London newspaper The Guardian, she has also written a number of books, including Tell Me the Truth, Dying for a Chat, So It's Cancer: Now What, and After Cancer: A Guide to Living Well. In Dying for a Chat, she writes that increased medical specialisation means that doctors can fail to see the whole picture, with risks for patients from a failure of communication.

Srivastava is a frequent co-host on The Conversation Hour, a flagship radio program on the Australian Broadcasting Corporation (ABC) Melbourne. She has also developed a podcast series on health and wellbeing for ABC Radio National. These podcasts include: "The Ripple Effect of Cancer" and "An Illness in the Family". Srivastava has been a health presenter on ABC News Breakfast and has appeared on other programs, including: Counterpoint, Catalyst, Q&A, and Life Matters and the ABC current affairs show 7:30. She has been a regular columnist for the former Melbourne Magazine, and a contributor to The Age, TIME Magazine Asia, The Week, The Lancet, and JAMA.

She has addressed many graduation ceremonies, commencement ceremonies, and major gatherings, and has hosted several events at the Wheeler Centre for Events and Ideas. Srivastava was selected to deliver the Errol Solomon Meyers Memorial Lecture at the University of Queensland Medical School. Former speakers have included Pakistani PM Imran Khan, Sir Edmund Hillary, and author Jeffrey Archer. She also delivered a TEDx talk in 2017 in Melbourne on The Art of Medicine.

Politics
Srivastava was an unsuccessful candidate for Liberal preselection in the seat of Casey in November 2021, prior to the 2022 federal election.

Awards and honours 
 Order of Australia medal (OAM) in 2017, awarded for her role in oncology and improving doctor-patient communication.
Bucksbaum Institute International Scholar, 2017 at the Bucksbaum Institute for Clinical Excellence at the University of Chicago.
 Dying for a Chat, Human Rights Literature Prize in 2013. .
 Finalist in the 2018 Walkley Awards in the "Commentary, Analysis, Opinion and Critique" category, for her article "Healthcare from the front-line".
 Westpac Women of Influence Award
 Monash University Distinguished Alumni Award
 Tell Me the Truth, shortlisted for the NSW Premier's Literary Prize in 2011.  
 What It Takes to Be A Doctor: An Insider's Guide, finalist for the Australian Career Book Award.
  Mumbrella Publish Awards, highly commendedSelected works

References

External links
 Ranjana Srivastava, Guardian'' contributor page

Living people
1974 births
21st-century Australian medical doctors
Australian oncologists
Women oncologists
Australian women medical doctors
Australian medical doctors
People from Melbourne
People from Canberra
21st-century women physicians
Monash University alumni
Australian women non-fiction writers
21st-century Australian non-fiction writers
21st-century Australian women writers
Harvard Kennedy School alumni